Andre Agassi was the defending champion, but took a rest in order to compete at the Nabisco Masters the following week.

Jaime Yzaga won the title by defeating Javier Frana 7–6(7–4), 6–2 in the final.

Seeds

Draw

Finals

Top half

Bottom half

References

External links
 Official results archive (ATP)
 Official results archive (ITF)

Citibank Open Singles
Citibank Open Singles